The Superior Dome is a domed stadium on the campus of Northern Michigan University (NMU) in Marquette, Michigan, United States. It opened as the "world’s largest wooden dome" on September 14, 1991, and is home to the Northern Michigan Wildcats football, women's lacrosse, and women's track and field teams, the NMU Wildcat marching band, and hosts a variety of other campus and community events.

It has a permanent seating capacity of 8,000 people, though the building can hold as many as 16,000 people. The 2010 edition of Guinness World Records listed it as the fifth-largest dome and largest wooden dome in the world.

Construction
The construction was finished in two phases. Phase I was finished in August 1991 and included the construction of the domed complex. Phase II, completed in May 1995, added locker rooms, department offices, meeting rooms, concession areas, a retail store and other building amenities. Phase I of the project cost $21.8 million and was funded entirely by the State of Michigan. Phase II was completed for $2.1 million, with $800,000 in private donations and $1.3 million in loans. Total cost for the Superior Dome stands at $23.9 million.  The general contractor for Phase 1 was R.E. Dailey & Company (Perini Corp.), Southfield, MI.  The architect was TMP Associates, Bloomfield Hills, MI.

Use

The Wildcats football team was the first to christen the Dome, hosting the first event in the facility on September 14, 1991. Northern defeated Indianapolis, 31–20, in front of a crowd of 7,942. Later that season, a Superior Dome attendance record was set at 8,432, when Northern defeated Ferris State, 27–17, on October 5. On September 18, 2008, a new attendance record was set as 8,672 watched Northern lose to the Michigan Tech Huskies in a televised game.

The dome features a retractable artificial turf carpet, the largest of its kind in the world. When extended, the turf can accommodate football, soccer and field hockey. Underneath the carpet is a synthetic playing surface that features three basketball/volleyball courts, two tennis courts and a  track. The carpet is winched in and out of place on a cushion of air. Retracting the turf carpet takes 30 minutes, with full setup taking approximately two hours.

President George W. Bush held a campaign rally in the stadium during the 2004 Presidential campaign.

References

External links
 360° interactive view of the Superior Dome

College football venues
Convention centers in Michigan
Covered stadiums in the United States
Geodesic domes
Modernist architecture in Michigan
Sports venues in Michigan
American football venues in Michigan
Northern Michigan Wildcats football
Tourist attractions in Marquette County, Michigan
Event venues established in 1991
Buildings and structures in Marquette, Michigan
1991 establishments in Michigan
Sports venues completed in 1991